The following places are called St. Mary's Park:
St. Mary's Park (Limerick), a housing estate in Ireland
St. Mary's Park (Castleblaney), a stadium
St. Mary's Park (Bronx), a public park in New York City
St. Mary's Park (San Francisco), a public park in California
St. Mary's Park, Northumberland, a settlement in North East England

Altab Ali Park in Whitechapel, East London was formerly known as St. Mary's Park.